Mesoptila compsodes is a moth in the family Geometridae first described by Edward Meyrick in 1891. It is found in Australia. Mesoptila compsodes is the type species of the genus Mesoptila.

References

Moths described in 1891
Eupitheciini